Harrison Scott Musgrave (born March 3, 1992) is an American former professional baseball pitcher. He made his MLB debut in 2018. Before his professional career, he played college baseball for the West Virginia Mountaineers.

Amateur career
Musgrave attended Bridgeport High School in Bridgeport, West Virginia, and West Virginia University, where he played college baseball for the West Virginia Mountaineers. In 2011, his freshman year at West Virginia, Musgrave underwent Tommy John surgery. In 2013, Musgrave 
had a 9–1 win–loss record, a 2.17 earned run average. He was named the Big 12 Conference Baseball Pitcher of the Year. The Philadelphia Phillies selected Musgrave in the 33rd round, with the 991st overall selection, of the 2013 MLB draft. He opted not to sign with the Phillies, and returned to West Virginia.

Professional career

Colorado Rockies
The Colorado Rockies selected Musgrave in the eighth round of the 2014 MLB draft. He signed with the Rockies, and pitched that year for the Grand Junction Rockies of the Rookie-level Pioneer League, posting a 2–4 record with a 5.44 ERA in 13 games.

Musgrave began the 2015 season with the Modesto Nuts of the Class A-Advanced California League and was promoted to the New Britain Rock Cats of the Class AA Eastern League. In 27 total games between Modesto and New Britain, Musgrave went 13–5 with a 2.99 ERA. He started the 2016 season with the Hartford Yard Goats of the Eastern League, and was promoted during the season to the Albuquerque Isotopes of the Class AAA Pacific Coast League. He pitched to a combined 13–8 record with a 3.64 ERA in  innings. He competed for a spot in the Rockies' starting rotation during spring training in 2017, but spent the season with Albuquerque where he went 3–1 with a 6.79 ERA in 12 games.

In 2018, the Rockies assigned Musgrave to Albuquerque. On April 23, the Rockies promoted Musgrave to the major leagues.

Musgrave was designated for assignment by the Rockies on July 31, 2019. He was outrighted on August 3. On March 9, 2020, Musgrave was released.

References

External links

1992 births
Living people
Sportspeople from Morgantown, West Virginia
Baseball players from West Virginia
Major League Baseball pitchers
Colorado Rockies players
West Virginia Mountaineers baseball players
Grand Junction Rockies players
Modesto Nuts players
New Britain Rock Cats players
Hartford Yard Goats players
Albuquerque Isotopes players